Mirosław Maciej Maleńczuk (born August 14, 1961 in Wojcieszów, Lower Silesian Voivodeship), also known as Vladimir, is a Polish vocalist, guitarist, poet, former leader of music groups Püdelsi and Homo Twist. He performed as a guest with Behemoth and was a judge in the third season of the Polish edition of the Idol series. He achieved worldwide popularity in late 2018 after his hit song "Vladimir" went viral in numerous Discord servers.

Discography

Studio albums

Collaborative albums

Compilation albums

Live albums

Poetry 
 "Chamstwo w państwie", Kraków 2003, Wydawnictwo Literackie,

References

1961 births
Living people
People from Złotoryja County
Polish poets
Recipients of the Bronze Medal for Merit to Culture – Gloria Artis
Polish rock singers
Polish pop singers
Polish country singers
Polish lyricists
20th-century Polish male singers
21st-century Polish male singers
21st-century Polish singers